Giuseppe Carriero (born 4 September 1997) is an Italian footballer  who plays as a midfielder for  club Cittadella.

Club career
Carriero made 61 appearances in Casertana in Serie C. Carriero signed a three and a half year contract with Parma in January 2018 but was loaned back to Casertana until the end of the 2017–18 season.

On 12 January 2019, he was loaned to Catania until 30 June 2019.

On 12 August 2019, he joined Monopoli on loan with an option to buy.

During his time with Parma, he appeared twice on the bench in Coppa Italia games.

On 5 January 2021, he signed a 3-year contract with Avellino.

On 18 July 2022, Carriero moved to Cittadella.

References

External links
 

1997 births
Living people
People from Desio
Footballers from Lombardy
Italian footballers
Association football midfielders
Serie C players
Serie D players
Casertana F.C. players
Parma Calcio 1913 players
Catania S.S.D. players
S.S. Monopoli 1966 players
U.S. Avellino 1912 players
A.S. Cittadella players
Sportspeople from the Province of Monza e Brianza